Robert Blair (born 7 August 1981) is a Scottish badminton player.

Blair was born in Scotland, but after attending Loughborough University in Leicestershire, he competed for England from 2001 until 2010, except at the Olympic Games, where Scotland and England are both parts of the Great Britain and Northern Ireland team. His main motivation for changing nation was the prospect of medals at the Commonwealth Games.

On 16 December 2010 Badminton England and Badminton Scotland announced that Blair would be returning to Scotland. The reason(s) for Blair's return to Scotland remain unclear, but reports suggest a falling-out with members of the Badminton England setup was central to the decision.

Career
Blair competed in badminton at the 2004 Summer Olympics in mixed doubles with partner Natalie Munt. They defeated Tadashi Ohtsuka and Shizuka Yamamoto of Japan in the first round but lost to Nova Widianto and Vita Marissa of Indonesia in the round of 16.

Blair reached the men's doubles final at the 2006 IBF World Championships together with Anthony Clark, losing the final against Cai Yun and Fu Haifeng.

Achievements

World Championships 
Men's doubles

Commonwealth Games 
Men's doubles

Mixed doubles

European Championships 
Men's doubles

BWF Grand Prix 
The BWF Grand Prix had two levels, the Grand Prix and Grand Prix Gold. It was a series of badminton tournaments sanctioned by the Badminton World Federation (BWF) and played between 2007 and 2017. The World Badminton Grand Prix was sanctioned by the International Badminton Federation from 1983 to 2006.

Men's doubles

Mixed doubles

 BWF Grand Prix Gold tournament
 BWF & IBF Grand Prix tournament

BWF International Challenge/Series 
Men's doubles

Mixed doubles

  BWF International Challenge tournament
  BWF International Series/ European Circuit tournament

Record against selected opponents
Mixed Doubles results with Gabrielle White against Super Series finalists, World Championships semifinalists, and Olympic quarterfinalists.

  Tao Jiaming & Tian Qing 0–1	
  Xu Chen & Ma Jin 0–3	
  Zhang Nan & Zhao Yunlei 0–1
  Chen Hung-ling & Cheng Wen-hsing 0–1
  Joachim Fischer Nielsen & Christinna Pedersen 0–1
  Thomas Laybourn & Kamilla Rytter Juhl 0–1	
  Chris Adcock & Imogen Bankier 1–1
  Tontowi Ahmad & Liliyana Natsir 0–2	
  Yoo Yeon-seong & Jang Ye-na 0–1	
  Ko Sung-hyun & Yoo Yeon-seong 2–1	
  Robert Mateusiak & Nadieżda Zięba 0–1
  Songphon Anugritayawon & Kunchala Voravichitchaikul 2–1	
  Sudket Prapakamol & Saralee Thungthongkam 1–2

References

1981 births
Living people
Sportspeople from Edinburgh
Anglo-Scots
Scottish male badminton players
English male badminton players
Alumni of Loughborough University
Badminton players at the 2004 Summer Olympics
Olympic badminton players of Great Britain
Badminton players at the 2002 Commonwealth Games
Badminton players at the 2006 Commonwealth Games
Commonwealth Games silver medallists for England
Commonwealth Games bronze medallists for England
Badminton players at the 2014 Commonwealth Games
Commonwealth Games bronze medallists for Scotland
Commonwealth Games medallists in badminton
Medallists at the 2006 Commonwealth Games